Orphan Black is a limited series of comic books based on the television series Orphan Black. The series is written by show creators John Fawcett and Graeme Manson, with Jody Houser serving as co-writer; Szymon Kudranski provides the artwork for issues #1 and #2, while Cat Staggs and Alan Quah shared art duties for issues #3-#5. The comic books are part of a limited series consisting of five issues, each focusing on the past and present life of a different clone.

Publication history
The first issue of the series was released on February 25, 2015. A new issue was released monthly until July 2015, when the final of the five contracted issues was released. The issues in order feature Sarah, Helena, Alison, Cosima and Rachel.

Plot

Series 1: The Clone Club

Issue #1: Sarah

The plot of the first issue closely follows the storyline established in the television series' pilot episode and similarly focuses on Sarah Manning and her discovery of her numerous genetic identicals. Scenes from the episode are recounted in the comic book, intermixed with new scenes and flashbacks. The new material specific to the comic books includes flashback sequences to Sarah's childhood, additions to and extensions of scenes in the present storyline, and insight into Sarah's thoughts and feelings as she takes over the life of a dead woman who shares her exact external appearance.

Issue #2: Helena
The second issue of the series, released in March 2015, focuses on Helena's childhood as well as her adult actions and motivations that are presented in the first season of the television series.

Series 2: Helsinki

Series 3: Deviations

Series 4: Crazy Science 
Crazy Science would have taken place after the end of the fifth season of the TV series. It would have starred Cosima and Delphine traveling around the world to cure 274 Leda clones while also falling even more in love. However, the series was cancelled in June 2018 due to low orders from comic shops. Due to an early printing deadline, the first issue was still released in July.

Tie-ins to the television series

The comic book miniseries was conceived as a way to convey information about the clones' pasts and childhoods without interrupting the fast pace of the television series. It is presented as an expanded universe that offers off-screen events not shown in the episodes. The comic books tie directly into the events of the show's first season in order to ground the comics into the already-established universe. The miniseries presents the audience with the opportunity to better understand the emotions, thoughts, and feelings that underlie the characters of the television series.

References

IDW Publishing titles
Comics based on television series
Comics about cloning
Orphan Black